Eklavya can refer to:

 Eklavya, a character from Mahabharata epic, who learns archery in the presence of a clay image of Drona.
 Eklavya foundation, an Indian NGO
 Eklavya: The Royal Guard, a 2007 Bollywood movie